The Szent-Györgyi Prize for Progress in Cancer Research, established by National Foundation for Cancer Research (NFCR) and named in honor of Albert Szent-Györgyi, Nobel laureate and co-founder of NFCR, has been awarded annually since 2006 to outstanding researchers whose scientific achievements have expanded the understanding of cancer and whose vision has moved cancer research in new directions. The Szent-Györgyi Prize honors researchers whose discoveries have made possible new approaches to preventing, diagnosing and/or treating cancer. The Prize recipient is honored at a formal dinner and award ceremony and receives a $25,000 cash prize. In addition, the recipient leads the next "Szent-Györgyi Prize Committee" as honorary chairman.

The Szent-Györgyi Prize is named in honor of Albert Szent-Györgyi, M.D., Ph.D. was a pioneer who challenged the conventional thinking of the day to pursue his novel ideas. After winning the Nobel Prize for his study on vitamin C and cell respiration, Dr. Szent-Györgyi set his sights on finding a way to defeat cancer. He was a leading advocate for developing resources to provide scientists with the financial support necessary to pursue novel cancer research ideas and in 1973 co-founded NFCR with entrepreneur Franklin C. Salisbury.  Since then, NFCR has provided more than $300 million in support of cancer research and prevention education programs.

NFCR established the Szent-Györgyi Prize to honor scientists who have made extraordinary progress in cancer research and to focus attention on the essential role of basic research in finding the answers to the mysteries of cancer. The Prize is also intended to stimulate continued investment in the pioneering research in the hope of producing scientific breakthroughs and lead to a deeper understanding of the scientific concepts behind the genetics and molecular makeup of cancer.

Szent-Györgyi Prize Recipients
Sources: NFCR, NFCR

 2021: Tak Wah Mak, Ph.D. - senior scientist at the Princess Margaret Cancer Centre and university professor at the University of Toronto
 2021: Mark M. Davis, Ph.D. - Professor of microbiology and immunology at the Stanford University
 2020: Susan Band Horwitz, Ph.D. - Professor and Rose C. Falkenstein Chair in Cancer Research at the Albert Einstein College of Medicine in New York
 2019: Steven Rosenberg, M.D., Ph.D. - Chief of the National Cancer Institute Center for Cancer Research’s surgery branch in Bethesda
 2018: Douglas R. Lowy and John T. Schiller - both of the Center for Cancer Research at the National Cancer Institute
 2017: Michael N. Hall, Ph.D. - Professor of Biochemistry, Biozentrum of the University of Basel, Switzerland
 2016: Mary-Claire King, Ph.D. - Professor of Medicine (Medical Genetics) and Genome Sciences at University of Washington
 2015: Frederick Alt, Ph.D. - Professor of Genetics at Harvard Medical School.  Director of the Program in Cellular and Molecular Medicine at Boston Children’s Hospital. Howard Hughes Medical Institute Investigator
2014 : James P. Allison, Ph.D. - Chairman, Department of Immunology at the University of Texas MD Anderson Cancer Center. Member of the National Academy of Sciences and the Institute of Medicine of the National Academies
2013: Alex Matter, M.D. - Alex Matter was announced the recipient of the 8th Annual Szent-Györgyi Prize for Progress in Cancer Research for his contributions to the development of the first drug specifically targeting a molecular lesion in cancer.

This first targeted cancer therapy, imatinib mesylate, or Gleevec, contributed to a major breakthrough in the treatment of Chronic Myelogenous Leukemia (CML), followed by its successful application to other malignant cancers by turning off the signal of the protein causing these cancers. With Gleevec, the outcome of treating CML went from the dismal and often deadly to a nearly 90% long-term survival with little or no side-effects.

Dr. Alex Matter's pioneering research in probing the molecular anatomy of tumor cells in search of cancer-causing proteins represents the start of a new era in cancer treatment: Gleevec was the first drug that translated the insights of molecular cancer biology into a highly effective anti-cancer drug, which offered proof that molecular targeting works in treating cancer.

2012: Zhen-Yi Wang, M.D. - Professor at the School of Medicine of Shanghai Jiao Tong University. Honorary Director of the Shanghai Institute of Haematology. Member of the Chinese Academy of Engineering and the French Academy of Sciences
2012: Zhu Chen, M.D., Ph.D. - Minister of Health of the People's Republic of China.  Professor at the School of Medicine of Shanghai Jiao Tong University'  Member of the Chinese Academy of Sciences, the United States National Academy of Sciences, the United States Institute of Medicine, the French Academy of Sciences, the Third World Academy of Sciences, and the European Academy of Arts, Sciences and Humanities
2011: Beatrice Mintz, Ph.D. - Professor and Jack Schultz Chair in Basic Science, Fox Chase Cancer Center. Member of the United States National Academy of Sciences and the Pontifical Academy of Sciences
2010: Peter K. Vogt, Ph.D. - Professor in the Department of Molecular and Experimental Medicine, The Scripps Research Institute.  Member of the American Academy of Arts and Sciences, the National Academy of Sciences, the Institute of Medicine of the National Academies, and the American Academy of Microbiology
2009: Ronald A. DePinho, M.D. - President of The University of Texas MD Anderson Cancer Center. (Prize received as Professor and Director, Belter Institute Department of Medicine and Genetics, Dana-Farber Cancer Institute and Harvard Medical School).  Member of the National Academy of Sciences, Institute of Medicine of the National Academies
2008: Carlo M. Croce, M.D. - Director of the Human Cancer Genetics Program and Director of the Institute of Genetics at The Ohio State University. Member of the National Academy of Sciences and the Institute of Medicine of the National Academies
2007: Webster K. Cavenee, Ph.D. - Director of the Ludwig Institute for Cancer Research, San Diego Branch. Distinguished Professor at the University of California, San Diego. Member of the National Academy of Sciences and the Institute of Medicine of the National Academies
2006: Harold F. Dvorak, M.D. - Mallinckrodt Professor Emeritus of Pathology at Harvard Medical School. Chief of the Department of Pathology at Beth Israel Deaconess Medical Center

See also

 List of medicine awards

References

American awards
Cancer research awards
Awards established in 2006